Andrew J. Platt (born December 12, 1988) is a former Democratic member of the Maryland House of Delegates who served a single term from 2015 to 2019.

See also
Government of Maryland

References

Democratic Party members of the Maryland House of Delegates
Living people
1988 births
People from Gaithersburg, Maryland
Catholic University of America alumni